Lambourne Golf Club is a golf club in Dropmore, Buckinghamshire, England. It is located about a mile north of Burnham and about 3 miles northwest of Slough, not far from the Burnham Beeches Golf Club. It was established in 1992 and the course was designed by Donald Steel.

References

Golf clubs and courses in Buckinghamshire
1992 establishments in England
Burnham, Buckinghamshire